Clinton Andrew Wagman (born 5 October 1990) is a South African rugby union player, who most recently played with the . His regular position is winger.

Career

Youth

Senior career
He made his debut during the 2011 Vodacom Cup competition, coming on as a half-time substitute against former team . In 2012, he firmly established himself in the first team, making a further 17 appearances.

References

South African rugby union players
Living people
1990 births
People from George, South Africa
SWD Eagles players
Rugby union players from the Western Cape
Rugby union wings